The Wyoming Infrared Observatory (WIRO) is an astronomical observatory owned and operated by the University of Wyoming. Recent research performed at WIRO includes searching for runaway stars, monitoring short-term variations in blazars, and monitoring massive binary stars.

Telescope

The  WIRO telescope is a classical Cassegrain reflector optimized for infrared observing.  The secondary mirror can be "wobbled" under computer control to allow for rapid sampling of adjacent areas of the sky. From 1977 to around 1980 the telescope was the largest functional infrared telescope in the world.

Two instruments are available for use: 
 WIRO-Prime, a 2048x2048 charge coupled device (CCD) imaging camera mounted at the prime focus.
 WIRO-Long Slit, a low resolution, high efficiency long slit spectrograph.

Research and discoveries

The telescope is used for a wide variety of research. It helped identify a new Globular star cluster within the  Milky Way Galaxy as part of a 2004 effort with the Spitzer Space Telescope. In 2016 the telescope again assisted efforts using the Spitzer telescope to identify and discover around 100 of the fastest-moving known stars in the Milky Way.
Other discoveries made at the observatory include:

 The first dust formation episode in a Wolf-Rayet star was recorded on UY Scuti soon after the telescope's first light in 1979.

See also 
 Red Buttes Observatory
 List of astronomical observatories
 List of largest infrared telescopes

References

External links
 Homepage for the University of Wyoming 2.3-meter Telescope (WIRO)
Clear Sky Clock for WIRO: forecasts of observing conditions.

Astronomical observatories in Wyoming
Buildings and structures in Albany County, Wyoming
University of Wyoming
Infrared telescopes
Astronomy in the United States